Józef Walerian Pilarz (10 June 1956 in Barlinek – 22 March 2008) was a Polish politician. Originally a farming contractor, he was elected to the Sejm in 2005 in the 37th Konin district as a candidate from Samoobrona Rzeczpospolitej Polskiej (Self-Defense of the Republic of Poland) list. In September 2006 he resigned from this post and moved to newly created party called Ruch Ludowo-Narodowy (Polish National Movement).

See also
Members of Polish Sejm 2005-2007

External links
Józef Pilarz - parliamentary page - includes declarations of interest, voting record, and transcripts of speeches.

1956 births
2008 deaths
People from Barlinek
Members of the Polish Sejm 2005–2007
Self-Defence of the Republic of Poland politicians